The history of Cantonment Public School & College, Rangpur can be traced to 1977 when the foundation stone was laid by Brig M. A Latif, the then commander of Northern Zone of Bangladesh in Rangpur Cantonment. The institution was organized for the education of the children of cantonment officers and local elite people. School Section began in 1978, College Section in 1981 and Degree Level in 1995. The English Medium Section was introduced in 1993. It was later named as 'The Millennium Stars' as a separate institution and continued functioning under the same principal up to October 2010 when a new principal was recruited and a separate governing body was formed.

The institution started functioning in 1978 from nursery to class VI. Later on, it extended up to class X in 1980 and the students first appeared in the S.S.C examination of 1982.

The Millennium Stars School and College, Rangpur runs up to XII class.

The schools, college and course have been affiliated with the Board of Intermediate and Secondary Education, Dinajpur and the degree course with Bangladesh National University.

Location
The campus is adjacent to the Rangpur–Dinajpur highway and half a km away from Rangpur Medical College.
It is located opposite of the Chadni Restaurant .

Notable alumni
 Mashiat Rahman, actress

References

Dinajpur Education Board
Schools in Rangpur District
Colleges in Rangpur District
Education in Rangpur, Bangladesh
Educational Institutions affiliated with Bangladesh Army